Tau Octantis, Latinized from τ Octantis, is a solitary star in the southern circumpolar constellation Octans. It has an apparent magnitude of 5.50, allowing it to be faintly seen with the naked eye.

Tau Octantis has a stellar classification of K2 III, indicating that the object is a red giant. It has 114% the mass of the Sun but is 223 times as luminous. However, an enlarged radius of  yields an effective temperature of 4,422 K, giving it an orange glow. Tau Octantis has an iron abundance 132% that of the Sun and is believed to be a member of the old disk population.

Reference

Octans
K-type giants
Octantis, Tau
Octantis, 81
219765
115836
8862
PD-88 204